Legend of the Wu-Tang is a compilation album by the Wu-Tang Clan, released in 2004. It is notable for including the rare unedited version of "Protect Ya Neck", a remix of the song "Method Man" with alternate verses, as well as "Shaolin Worldwide", "Sucker M.C.'s" (a Run D.M.C. cover) and "Diesel", three tracks the Wu-Tang produced for soundtracks and compilations. The inside booklet can be unfolded to form a mini-poster of the group. The album was made to further cement Wu Tang Clan's legacy as one of the most influential groups in recent years. The album was also made to not only help introduce new listeners to the group's music but to also satisfy fans of the group as well. Twenty six versions of this album were released worldwide which includes CD's, vinyls, and cassettes

Track listing

References

Wu-Tang Clan albums
Hip hop compilation albums
2004 greatest hits albums